9175 Graun, provisional designation , is a stony Eunomian asteroid from the central region of the asteroid belt, approximately 10 kilometers in diameter. It was discovered on 29 July 1990, by American astronomer Henry E. Holt at Palomar Observatory in California, United States. The asteroid was later named for American author and amateur astronomer Ken Graun.

Orbit and classification 

Graun is a member of the Eunomia family, a large group of S-type asteroids and the most prominent family in the intermediate main-belt. It orbits the Sun at a distance of 2.2–3.0 AU once every 4 years and 2 months (1,531 days). Its orbit has an eccentricity of 0.14 and an inclination of 15° with respect to the ecliptic.

Alternative family 

Based on its concurring orbital elements, Graun has also been group into the Maria family, which is named after its namesake, the asteroid 170 Maria. It is an old-type asteroid family, about  years old, located near the area of a 3:1 resonances with Jupiter that supplies near-Earth asteroids to the inner Solar System. It is estimated that every 100 million years, about 37 to 75 Maria asteroids larger than 1 kilometer become near-Earth objects.

Physical characteristics

Lightcurves 

In January 2013, a rotational lightcurve of Graun was obtained from photometric observations. Lightcurve analysis gave a rotation period of  hours with a brightness variation of 0.16 magnitude. The measurement supersedes a shorter period of 20 hours with an amplitude of 0.2 magnitude.

Diameter and albedo 

According to the surveys carried out by the NEOWISE mission of NASA's Wide-field Infrared Survey Explorer and the Japanese Akari satellite, Graun measures 10.23 and 10.35 kilometers in diameter, and its surface has an albedo of 0.20 and 0.183, respectively. Preliminary NEOWISE results gave a much higher albedo and consequently shorter diameter.

The Collaborative Asteroid Lightcurve Link assumes an albedo of 0.21 – derived from 15 Eunomia, the family's largest member and namesake – and calculates a diameter of 10.53 kilometers with an absolute magnitude of 12.2.

Naming 

This minor planet was named in honor of American amateur astronomer and publisher Ken Graun (born 1955), author of two books on astronomy, owner of "Ken Press" and the website What's Out tonight?, bringing astronomy to the broader public including children. The official naming citation was published by the Minor Planet Center on 9 March 2001.

References

External links 
 Asteroid Lightcurve Database (LCDB), query form (info )
 Dictionary of Minor Planet Names, Google books
 Asteroids and comets rotation curves, CdR – Observatoire de Genève, Raoul Behrend
 Discovery Circumstances: Numbered Minor Planets (5001)-(10000) – Minor Planet Center
 
 

009175
009175
Discoveries by Henry E. Holt
Named minor planets
19900729